Fencing at the 1986 Asian Games was held in Seoul, South Korea from September 25 to October 1, 1986.

Medalists

Men

Women

Medal table

References
 New Straits Times, September 26 – October 2, 1986
 1986 Asian Games medalists

External links
 Olympic Council of Asia

 
1986 Asian Games events
1986
Asian Games
1986 Asian Games